William Neizer Laing (3 January 1929 – 19 January 1997) was a Ghanaian athlete. He competed in the men's triple jump at the 1952 Summer Olympics.

References

1929 births
1997 deaths
Athletes (track and field) at the 1952 Summer Olympics
Ghanaian male triple jumpers
Olympic athletes of Ghana
Place of birth missing
20th-century Ghanaian people